Il Polpo is an Italian television series.

See also
List of Italian television series

Italian television series

1993 Italian television series debuts